The Eastern Rietzschke is a river flowing through Leipzig.

References

See also
List of rivers of Saxony

Rivers of Saxony
2Eastern Rietzschke
Rivers of Germany